Artyom Kisly (born April 28, 1989) is a Belarusian ice hockey player who is currently playing for HK Neman Grodno of the Belarusian Extraleague.

Kisly competed in the 2013 IIHF World Championship as a member of the Belarus men's national ice hockey team.

References

External links

1989 births
Living people
Belarusian ice hockey forwards
Sportspeople from Grodno
HK Neman Grodno players